Umunahu is a village in southeastern Nigeria located near the city of Owerri.

Towns in Imo State